Events in the year 1815 in Norway.

Incumbents
Monarch: Charles II

Events
 31 July - The 1815 Act of Union was passed by the Storting.
 30 April – Population Census: Norway had 885,431 inhabitants.
 The Supreme Court of Norway was established on the basis of the Constitution of Norway's §88, prescribing an independent judiciary.

Arts and literature

Births

19 February – Elise Wærenskjold, Norwegian-American pioneer in Texas (d. 1895)
4 April – Johannes Wilhelm Christian Dietrichson, Lutheran Minister (d. 1883)
3 May – Mads Langaard, brewery owner and industrialist (d.1891).
4 July – Daniel Cornelius Danielssen, physician (d.1894)
23 July – Johan Christian Johnsen, politician (d.1898)
30 July – Herman Severin Løvenskiold, composer (d.1870)
15 September – Halfdan Kjerulf, composer (d.1868)

Full date unknown
Nicolai Friis, politician (d.1888)
Hans Peder Johansen Hafslund, politician
Thomas Henrik Hammer, jurist and politician (d.1900)
Hans Gerhard Colbjørnsen Meldahl, jurist and politician (d.1877)
Joseph Frantz Oscar Wergeland, military officer, cartographer and skiing pioneer (d.1895)

Deaths
 20 February - Maren Juel, landowner (b.1749)
 9 December - Catharina Lysholm, businesswoman and ship-owner (b.1744)

See also

References